Ali Asghar Modirrousta (born July 25, 1968) is a retired Iranian football striker and now coach.

Modir Roosta is a former member of Iran national football team. He was also a Futsal player and appeared for Iran national futsal team at the FIFA Futsal World Cup 1992.

Club career 
He played for a few clubs in Iran, most notably Pas Tehran, and later in his career Paykan F.C. In season 1996/97, he became the top goalscorer in Iran's top division football league by scoring 18 goals for Bahman FC, helping the club to finish second in the overall standings, just behind the season's champion Persepolis FC.

International career 
He played for the Iranian national football team on several occasions during the 1990s, earning an impressive record of 18 goals scored in 32 appearances.

Career statistics

International goals

Coaching career 
He was appointed as the coach of Paykan in 2008 where he stayed for about a year but was sacked in the last few weeks of the 2008–09 season. He was appointed as the coach of Pas in October 2009 and was sacked by club in June 2011. He was appointed as head coach of Shahrdari Tabriz on 24 December 2011 and took the reins of the club on 1 January 2012 in a match against Mes Kerman which his team lost 1–0. He was sacked at the end of the season when Shahrdari was relegated to the Azadegan League.

Coaching career

References 

1968 births
Living people
People from Tehran
Iranian footballers
Iranian football managers
Iran international footballers
Association football forwards
Iranian men's futsal players
Pas players
Naft Tehran F.C. players
Paykan F.C. players
Keshavarz players
1992 AFC Asian Cup players
Bahman players
Paykan F.C. managers
Pas Hamedan F.C. managers
Azadegan League players
Persian Gulf Pro League players
Footballers at the 1994 Asian Games
Asian Games competitors for Iran